Indian Predator: Murder in A Courtroom is a docuseries based on the true story of Bharat Kalicharan Yadav aka Akku Yadav which happened in Nagpur, Maharashtra. According to some media, he raped more than 40 women. who lived in Kasturba Nagar, Nagpur.

Overview 
Indian Predator: Murder in a Courtroom is a Netflix original documentary series with three episodes. The whole series is narrated by Vilas Bhande and Resha Raut, who are both accused of Akku Yadav's murder. In 1997, Akku Yadav killed his best friend Avinash Tiwari, and after two years, he killed Asha Bhagat, who sold liquor in Kasturba Nagar, Nagpur. On 13 August 2004, 200 women of Kasturba Nagar killed Akku Yadav in Court No. 7 of the District court of Nagpur because he raped more than 40 women.

References 

Indian docudrama films
Netflix original documentary television series
2020s documentary television series